The 162nd Virginia General Assembly, consisting of members who were elected in both the House election in 2021 and the Senate election in 2019, convened on January 12, 2022. The legislature is the first since the 156th Assembly ended in 2012 to be of divided party control, with Republicans again controlling the House of Delegates and Democrats holding the Senate.

Membership 

On November 14, 2021, the incoming Republican majority in the House unanimously nominated Delegate Todd Gilbert (R-Shenandoah) for Speaker of the House of Delegates and Delegate Terry Kilgore (R-Scott County) for Majority Leader.

For the third consecutive time since the beginning of the 160th Assembly in 2018, a record number of women are serving in the legislature: 34 in the House and 11 in the Senate, with the House having seen an increase of four women from the 161st Assembly.

Leadership

Senate 

 Senate Majority Leader: Dick Saslaw (D)
 Senate Minority Leader: Tommy Norment (R)
 Senate Majority Caucus Chair: Mamie Locke (D)
 Senate President pro-tempore: L. Louise Lucas (D)
 Senate Majority Caucus Vice Chair: Scott Surovell (D)
 Senate Majority Caucus Vice Chair for Policy: Jeremy McPike (D)
 Senate Majority Caucus Secretary: Jennifer McClellan (D)
 Senate Majority Caucus Treasurer: Ghazala Hashmi (D)
 Senate Majority Whips: Barbara Favola (D) and Lionell Spruill (D)
 Senate Majority Sergeant at Arms: Jennifer Boysko (D)
 Clerk: Susan Clarke Schaar

Committee chairs and ranking members 
The Senate of Virginia has 10 Standing Committees and a Committee on Rules.

House of Delegates 

 Speaker: Todd Gilbert (R)
 House Majority Leader: Terry Kilgore (R)
 House Majority Caucus Chair: Kathy Byron (R)
 House Majority Whip: Jay Leftwich (R)
 House Minority Leader: vacant
 House Minority Caucus Chair: Charniele Herring
 House Minority Treasurer: Betsy Carr
 House Minority Whip: Alfonso Lopez
 House Minority Secretary: Marcus Simon
 House Minority Vice Chair for Operations: Jeion Ward
 House Minority Vice Chair for Outreach: vacant
 House Minority Sergeant at Arms: Elizabeth Guzman
 Clerk: G. Paul Nardo

References

Virginia legislative sessions
2021 in Virginia
2022 in Virginia
Virginia